Marco Rizzo (born 12 October 1959 in Turin) is an Italian politician, who served as leader of the Communist Party (PC) from 2009 to 2023, and as leader of Sovereign and Popular Italy in 2022.

Biography
A graduate in political science in 1985, he was a lecturer in vocational guidance (1985–1994).

From 1986 to 1991, he was a member of the Turin Province party executive of the Italian Communist Party (PCI), and joined the Communist Refoundation Party (PRC) in 1991, serving as its representative to the Council of the Turin Province until 1995. Between 1994 and 2004, he served in the Chamber of Deputies of Italy. In 1995–1998, he was coordinator of the National Secretariat of the PRC, then left to become a founding member and Italian Parliament group-leader of the Party of Italian Communists (until 2004).

In July 2009, after his expulsion from the Party of Italian Communists (having supported the IdV's candidate Gianni Vattimo in the 2009 European election), he founded a new party called Communists – Popular Left (then renamed Communist Party).
Marco Rizzo was a Member of the European Parliament for the North-West with the Party of Italian Communists, Member of the Bureau of the European United Left - Nordic Green Left and vice-chair of the European Parliament's Committee on the Internal Market and Consumer Protection.

Works

See also
2004 European Parliament election in Italy

References

External links

1959 births
Living people
Politicians from Turin
Italian Communist Party politicians
20th-century Italian politicians
Communist Refoundation Party politicians
Party of Italian Communists MEPs
MEPs for Italy 2004–2009
21st-century Italian politicians
Party of Italian Communists politicians